Some Like It Veiled is a 2017 French comedy film directed by Sou Abadi.

Cast 
 Félix Moati - Armand
 Camélia Jordana - Leila
 William Lebghil - Mahmoud
 Anne Alvaro - Mitra
 Miki Manojlović - Darius

References

External links 

2017 comedy films
French comedy films
2010s French films
2010s French-language films